The men's pole vault event at the 1970 Summer Universiade was held at the Stadio Comunale in Turin on 3 September 1970.

Records

Results

References

Athletics at the 1970 Summer Universiade
1970